The AFC third round of 2010 FIFA World Cup qualification was decided by a random draw which was conducted in Durban, South Africa on 25 November 2007. The round began on 6 February 2008 and finished on 22 June 2008.

The top two countries in each group at the end of the stage progressed to the fourth round, where the ten remaining teams will be divided into two groups of five.

Format
The 20 teams (five teams given a bye directly to the third round, 11 highest-ranked winners from the first round, and four winners from the second round) were divided into four pots for the draw, each containing five teams. The pots were drawn as follows:

The 20 teams were split into five groups of four teams each, with all teams playing home and away against each of the other three teams in the group.

The top two teams in each group qualified for the fourth round.

Group 1

Group 2

Group 3

Group 4

Group 5

Goalscorers
A total of 137 goals were scored over 60 games, for an average of 2.28 goals per game.
6 goals

 Ahmad Ajab

4 goals

 Hassan Abdel Fattah
 Ismail Matar
 Server Djeparov

3 goals

 Yuji Nakazawa
 Hong Yong-jo
 Yasser Al-Qahtani
 Malek Mouath
 Redha Tukar
 Kim Do-heon
 Jehad Al-Hussain
 Odil Ahmedov

2 goals

 Brett Emerton
 Harry Kewell
 A'ala Hubail
 Salman Isa
 Gholamreza Rezaei
 Emad Mohammed
 Yasuhito Endō
 Yoshito Ōkubo
 Ismail Sulaiman Al Ajmi
 Amad Al Hosni
 Fábio César Montezine
 Abdoh Otaif
 Aleksandar Đurić
 John Wilkinson
 Park Chu-young
 Park Ji-sung
 Seol Ki-hyeon
 Firas Al-Khatib
 Teeratep Winothai
 Timur Kapadze
 Maksim Shatskikh

1 goal

 Mark Bresciano
 Tim Cahill
 Joshua Kennedy
 Faouzi Aaish
 Ismail Abdullatif
 Sayed Mohamed Adnan
 Sun Xiang
 Zheng Zhi
 Zhou Haibin
 Jalal Hosseini
 Mohsen Khalili
 Javad Nekounam
 Alireza Vahedi Nikbakht
 Ferydoon Zandi
 Nashat Akram
 Hawar Mulla Mohammed
 Seiichiro Maki
 Kengo Nakamura
 Shunsuke Nakamura
 Marcus Tulio Tanaka
 Atsuto Uchida
 Waseem Al-Bzour
 Thaer Bawab
 Fahad Al-Rashidi
 Mahmoud El Ali
 Mohammed Ghaddar
 Choe Kum-chol
 Ahmed Mubarak Al Mahaijri
 Sayed Ali Bechir
 Khalfan Ibrahim
 Sebastián Soria
 Ahmed Al-Fraidi
 Saad Al-Harthi
 Osama Hawsawi
 Mustafic Fahrudin
 Fazrul Nawaz
 Kwak Tae-hwi
 Zyad Chaabo
 Sanharib Malki
 Sarayoot Chaikamdee
 Totchtawan Sripan
 Datsakorn Thonglao
 Guvanch Ovekov
 Saif Mohammed Al Bishr
 Mohamed Al Shehhi
 Faisal Khalil
 Vitaliy Denisov
 Alexander Geynrikh
 Aziz Ibrahimov
 Victor Karpenko

1 own goal

 Ramez Dayoub (playing against Singapore)
 Baihakki Khaizan (playing against Lebanon)
 Anas Al Khouja (playing against Kuwait)

Notes

References

External links
 Asian zone at FIFA.com
 Results and schedule at the-AFC.com

3
Qual